Zona is a BitTorrent client for watching streaming video content. Described as a "Popcorn Time beater", the application provides a free alternative to subscription-based video streaming services (such as Netflix). In addition to on-demand movies and television series, Zona offers streaming music, live television channels, news, live sports, and games. Zona has been criticized for being closed-source as well as having an installer that has been implicated as malware.

See also
 Popcorn Time
 Porn Time
 Comparison of BitTorrent clients

References

2014 software
BitTorrent clients
Media players
Peer-to-peer
Streaming media systems
Streaming software
Video on demand services